Alturas is a town in Modoc County, California.

Alturas may also refer to:

 Alturas, Florida, an unincorporated community in Polk County, Florida
 Alturas County, Idaho, historical county from 1864 to 1895
 Alturas Lake in Idaho
 Alturas Indian Rancheria, a federally recognized tribe of Achomawi Indians in California
 Alturas (potato)

See also 

 Altura (disambiguation)